Kiwanis Lake is located in Kiwanis Community Park in central Tempe, Arizona, United States, southwest of Baseline Road and Mill Avenue.

Fish species
 Rainbow trout
 Largemouth bass
 Yellow bass
 Sunfish
 Catfish (channel)
 Catfish (flathead)
 Tilapia
 Carp

References

External links
 Arizona fishing locations map
 Arizona boating locations facilities map

Reservoirs in Arizona
Reservoirs in Maricopa County, Arizona
Kiwanis